The Inheritance of Tordis (German: Die Erbin von Tordis) is a 1921 German silent drama film directed by Robert Dinesen and starring Ica von Lenkeffy, Paul Hartmann and Adolf Klein.

The film's sets were designed by the art director István Szirontai Lhotka.

Cast
 Ica von Lenkeffy as Anne Kathrin 
 Paul Hartmann as Graf von Heyst 
 Adolf Klein as Oberst von Ingenhofen 
 Ilka Grüning as seine Frau 
 Frida Richard as Die alte Fürstin 
 Lucie Höflich as Anna Kathrins Mutter 
 Karl Platen as Schuster 
 Paul Otto as Kammerherr 
 Ernst Hofmann
 Albert Patry
 Arnold Korff
 Hermann Picha

References

Bibliography
 Hans-Michael Bock & Michael Töteberg. Das Ufa-Buch. Zweitausendeins, 1992.
 Grange, William. Cultural Chronicle of the Weimar Republic. Scarecrow Press, 2008.

External links

1921 films
Films of the Weimar Republic
Films directed by Robert Dinesen
German silent feature films
1921 drama films
German drama films
UFA GmbH films
German black-and-white films
Silent drama films
1920s German films